Daily News Brands, formerly Star Media Group, is a Canadian media organization and a division of Torstar Corporation. Its flagship publication is the Toronto Star newspaper, which is owned by Toronto Star Newspapers Limited, a subsidiary of Torstar.

Portfolio

 Toronto Star Newspapers Limited
The Kit
Toronto Star
Torstar Syndication Services
Fantasy Sports
Real Estate News and Dream Homes with Metroland Media Group
Corporate Information Technology Division
Wheels.ca, a Canadian automotive website

Former holdings
Eye Weekly
The Grid
GTA Today
Starweek
Torstar Media Group Television
ShopTV Canada
Workopolis (50%), employment website. Formerly a joint venture with Square Victoria Digital Properties until Indeed purchased Workopolis in June 2018.

Joint interests
The Daily News Brands division also manages Torstar's jointly owned interests in:
Sing Tao Daily (50%), the largest Chinese language newspaper in Canada. A joint venture with Sing Tao News Corporation.
StarMetro (90%), free daily commuter newspaper with editions in Toronto, Calgary, Edmonton, Halifax, and Vancouver. A joint venture with Metro International.

See also 
Torstar
Metroland Media Group

References

External links

Torstar
Companies with year of establishment missing
Year of establishment missing
Companies based in Toronto